Mo Shaoping (Chinese: 莫少平), is a Chinese lawyer who represented the imprisoned journalist Shi Tao, after the lawyer Guo Guoting.

He also was a defense lawyer on the case of Liu Xiaobo.

The founder of Beijing Mo Shaoping Law Firm, Mo Shaoping is also a member of the Human Rights and Constitutional Law Committee of the All China Lawyers Association. Specialized in criminal law, he and his cohort are known internationally for many politically sensitive cases, including that of Liu Xiaobo. He represents Liu Xiaobing's wife, Liu Xia, who has been held under house arrest with no access to Internet and nearly no visitors.

See also
Human rights in the People's Republic of China

References

20th-century Chinese lawyers
21st-century Chinese lawyers
Living people
Weiquan movement
Year of birth missing (living people)
Place of birth missing (living people)